Kim Sung-hwan (born 15 December 1986) is a South Korean football who plays as a defensive midfielder for K3 League side Hwaseong.

Club career
Kim Sung-hwan would play college football at Dong-A University in Busan where he initially started as a forward before being converted into a defender and go on to sign his first contract in 2009 with top tier football club Seongnam FC. The Head coach Shin Tae-yong showed significant faith within Kim and immediately incorporated him as a significant part of the teams defence that ended the 2009 K League season as runners-up to Jeonbuk Hyundai Motors. Already an integral part of the team Kim would win his first piece of silverware when Seongnam won the 2010 AFC Champions League Final against Zob Ahan. This was followed with the 2011 Korean FA Cup, in a 1-0 victory against Suwon Samsung Bluewings.

The 2012 K-League season would see Seongnam struggle within the campaign and they finished in a disappointing twelfth within the league as well as flirting with relegation, which saw Shin Tae-yong leave the club and be replaced by An Ik-soo. The new manager allowed Kim to be transferred to another top tier club in Ulsan Hyundai. At his new club Kim immediately established himself as regular and guided the club to a runners-up position at the end of the 2013 K League Classic season. From 2015 to 2016 he played for Sangju Sangmu as part of his compulsory two-year military duty. With the club allowed to participate within the Korean football pyramid system, Kim was part of the side that won the 2015 K League Challenge and promotion to the top tier.

Kim would return to Ulsan where he would go on to win the 2017 Korean FA Cup against Busan IPark, however despite this he was allowed to leave the club on a free transfer to Thai football club Port F.C. for the start of the 2018 Thai League 1 season. The following season he joined another Thai club in Suphanburi on loan before joining Chinese football team Liaoning Shenyang Urban. Kim would join top tier Chinese club Henan Jianye and go on to make his debut in a league game against Dalian Professional F.C. on 3 September 2020 in a 4-0 defeat.

Career statistics 
.

Honors

Club
Seongnam FC
 AFC Champions League: 2010 
 Korean FA Cup: 2011

Sangju Sangmu
 K League 2: 2015

Ulsan Hyundai
 Korean FA Cup: 2017

References

External links 
 

1986 births
Living people
Association football defenders
South Korean footballers
South Korea international footballers
Seongnam FC players
Ulsan Hyundai FC players
Gimcheon Sangmu FC players
Liaoning Shenyang Urban F.C. players
Henan Songshan Longmen F.C. players
K League 1 players
K League 2 players
K3 League players
China League One players
Chinese Super League players
Expatriate footballers in China
South Korean expatriate sportspeople in China
Sportspeople from Busan